Commune V (Niamey), also known as Niamey V, is an urban commune in Niger. It is a commune of the capital city of Niamey. It is located in the south-western shore of the Niger River.

References

External links

Commune 5